Pymatuning can refer to several places in the U.S. States of Ohio and Pennsylvania:

Ohio

Ashtabula County
Pymatuning State Park (Ohio)
Pymatuning Valley High School

Pennsylvania

Crawford County
Pymatuning Central, Pennsylvania, a census-designated place
Pymatuning North, Pennsylvania, a census-designated place
Pymatuning South, Pennsylvania, a census-designated place
Pymatuning State Park (Pennsylvania)
Pymatuning Laboratory of Ecology, the ecology field station of the University of Pittsburgh

Mercer County
Pymatuning Township, Pennsylvania
South Pymatuning Township, Pennsylvania

Ohio and Pennsylvania
Pymatuning Reservoir, a man-made lake
Pymatuning Creek, a tributary of the Shenango River